Zurlo is an Italian surname. Notable people with the surname include:

Federico Zurlo (born 1994), Italian cyclist
Giuseppe Capece Zurlo (1711–1801), Italian Cardinal who served as Archbishop of Naples

Italian-language surnames